The 1996 CONMEBOL Pre-Olympic Tournament began on 18 February 1996 and was the 10th CONMEBOL Pre-Olympic Tournament. This was the second tournament open to players under the age of 23 without any other restriction. There was no qualification stage and all 10 members of CONMEBOL automatically qualified. The winner and the runner-up qualified for 1996 Summer Olympics. Players born on or after 1 January 1973 were eligible to play in this competition.

Venues

Group stage

Group 1

Group 2

Final round

Broadcasting rights 
 : Canal UNO

References

CONMEBOL Pre-Olympic Tournament
CONMEBOL competitions
Football qualification for the 1996 Summer Olympics